Rydsnäs is a locality situated in Ydre Municipality, Östergötland County, Sweden with 277 inhabitants in 2010.

References 

Populated places in Östergötland County
Populated places in Ydre Municipality